The 1894 Richmond Colts football team was an American football team that represented Richmond College—now known as the University of Richmond—as an independent during the 1894 college football season. Led by third-year head coach Dana Rucker, Richmond compiled a record of 0–4–2. The team failed to win a game, and lost twice to Southern champion Virginia.

Schedule

References

Richmond
Richmond Spiders football seasons
College football winless seasons
Richmond Spiders football